Behman Jassa Singh is a village in the northern Indian state of Punjab. It is located at longitude 74 56'E and latitude 30 12'N. Its postal pin code is 151302.

Villages in Sri Muktsar Sahib district